Hypericum naudinianum is a perennial herb in the genus Hypericum, in the section Adenosepalum.

Description
The species grows to be 1.5 meters tall. Its stems are reddish brown and its leaves are sessile. It has obtuse flowers that are 15-17mm in diameter. The petals are described as "clear butter yellow" and are veined red.

Distribution
Hypericum naudinianum is found in Algeria and Morocco near streamsides and waterfalls.

References

naudinianum
Flora of Algeria
Flora of Morocco